Nimbus Publishing is a publishing company based in Halifax, Nova Scotia. The company specializes in subjects relevant to the Atlantic Provinces.  

Until 2016, the company published an average of 35 to 40 new titles a year, but expanded its output to 55 titles in 2017. The company publishes in a broad span of genres including children’s picture and fiction books, non-fiction, history, nature photography, current events, biography, sports, and cultural issues. 

It is the largest Canadian-English language publisher east of Toronto. 

In 2005, Nimbus introduced a new fiction imprint called Vagrant Press. In 2012, owner John Marshall sold the company and general manager Dan Soucoup retired. Two employees, Terrilee Bulger and Heather Bryan, bought the company in order to prevent acquisition by a larger publishing house.
 
In March 2018, the publishing house moved to a warehouse on Strawberry Hill Street in Halifax. At that time, a coffee shop and bookstore were added to the premises.

Notable authors

 Sheree Fitch
Jill Barber
Graham Steele
Bette MacDonald
 Paul Hollingsworth
 Janet Kitz
 John Boileau
 Nancy Regan
 Carol Bruneau

Notable titles

Bud the Spud and Hockey Night Tonight, by Stompin' Tom Connors
Shattered City: The Halifax Explosion and the Road to Recovery, by Janet Kitz
 We Were Not the Savages, by Daniel N. Paul

References

External links
 Official website

Book publishing companies of Canada
Publishing companies established in 1978
Companies based in Halifax, Nova Scotia
Culture of Halifax, Nova Scotia
1978 establishments in Nova Scotia